Andro Bušlje (born 4 January 1986) is a Croatian water polo player who competed in the 2008 Summer Olympics, 2012 Summer Olympics and 2016 Summer Olympics. At the 2012 Summer Olympics he was part of the Croatian team that won the gold medal.  He is right-handed and plays the center defender position. From 2016 to 2019 he played for Greek powerhouse Olympiacos, with whom he won the 2017–18 LEN Champions League. He started playing water polo at the age of 12, and he made his national team debut in 2005. Bušlje is one of the top defenders in the world.

Bušlje is currently the captain of the Croatia national team, with whom he has become Olympic gold medalist, 2 times World Champion and European Champion. He is the only water polo player in the world to have won 7 FINA World Championship medals (2 gold, 1 silver and 4 bronze), an all-time record as of 2017

Bušlje was given the honour to carry the national flag of Croatia at the closing ceremony of the 2020 Summer Olympics in Tokyo, becoming the 29th water polo player to be a flag bearer at the opening and closing ceremonies of the Olympics.

Honours

Club

Jug Dubrovnik
LEN Champions League: 2005–06 ;runners-up: 2006–07, 2007–08, 2012–13
LEN Super Cup: 2006
Croatian Championship: 2003–04, 2004–05, 2005–06,  2006–07,  2008–09,  2009–10, 2010–11, 2011–12, 2012–13
Croatian Cup: 2003–04, 2004–05, 2006–07, 2007–08,  2008–09, 2009–10
Adriatic League: 2008–09

Olympiacos
LEN Champions League: 2017–18 ;runners-up: 2018–19
Greek Championship: 2016–17, 2017–18, 2018–19, 2021–22
Greek Cup: 2017–18, 2018–19, 2021–22, 2022–23
Greek Super Cup: 2018

Mladost
Croatian Championship:  2020–21
Croatian Cup: 2020–21

Awards
Member of the World Team  by total-waterpolo 2017
 Croatian Water Polo Player of the Year: 2018 with Olympiacos 
Fifth Best European Player in the World by LEN 2019
Best Croatian Defender of the Year: 2012, 2013, 2016, 2017, 2018, 2020, 2021

See also
 Croatia men's Olympic water polo team records and statistics
 List of Olympic champions in men's water polo
 List of Olympic medalists in water polo (men)
 List of flag bearers for Croatia at the Olympics
 List of world champions in men's water polo
 List of World Aquatics Championships medalists in water polo
2017–18 Croatian "Athlete of the Year "
fifth best player in the world: 2018
Croatian Championship MVP 2020–21

References

External links
 

1986 births
Living people
Sportspeople from Dubrovnik
Croatian male water polo players
Water polo centre backs
Water polo players at the 2008 Summer Olympics
Water polo players at the 2012 Summer Olympics
Water polo players at the 2016 Summer Olympics
Medalists at the 2012 Summer Olympics
Medalists at the 2016 Summer Olympics
Olympic gold medalists for Croatia in water polo
Olympic silver medalists for Croatia in water polo
World Aquatics Championships medalists in water polo
Competitors at the 2013 Mediterranean Games
Mediterranean Games medalists in water polo
Mediterranean Games gold medalists for Croatia
Olympiacos Water Polo Club players
Croatian expatriate sportspeople in Greece
Croatian expatriate sportspeople in Italy
Expatriate water polo players
Water polo players at the 2020 Summer Olympics